"Big Empty" is a song by the American rock band Stone Temple Pilots that first appeared in 1994 on the soundtrack of the film The Crow. The band later included the song on its second album, Purple, and released it as the lead single from that album. The song reached No. 3 and No. 7 on the Billboard Mainstream Rock Tracks and Modern Rock Tracks charts, respectively. The song won a MTV Movie Award for best song featured in a movie in 1995.

Musically, the song  has a similar format to the band's previous single "Creep", beginning with a slow, soft acoustic verse that leads into a loud and distorted chorus with a heavy guitar similar to "Plush". "Big Empty" appears on the greatest hits compilation albums Thank You and Buy This.

AllMusic critic Stephen Thomas Erlewine wrote that "'Big Empty' is a perfect encapsulation of mainstream alienation" and praised it as a highlight on Purple.

Charts

Live performances

The song was performed live for the first time during a taping of MTV Unplugged on November 17, 1993, seven months before Purple was released. "Big Empty" was not included when their Unplugged episode debuted in January 1994. However, in May to help promote The Crow soundtrack, MTV placed the Unplugged performance of "Big Empty" into their heavy video rotation, as there was never an official promo video for the song. On STP's 2008 reunion tour, "Big Empty" was the opening song for every show except for the band's performance at the Virgin Mobile Festival in Baltimore on August 10.

References

1994 singles
1994 songs
Atlantic Records singles
Rock ballads
Stone Temple Pilots songs
Songs written by Scott Weiland
Songs written by Robert DeLeo
Song recordings produced by Brendan O'Brien (record producer)
Blues rock songs